The Ogongo  Agricultural College is a college in Ogongo in the Omusati Region of northern Namibia. The college was founded in 1973 to train locals in agriculture. The college was closed between 1988 and 1992 due to civil disorder. The Ogongo Agricultural College is part of the University of Namibia and it has led to job creation for the local population and attracts visitors from across the country as well as abroad. Apart from employment, the college, which is at the moment known as the University of Namibia Ogongo Campus offers the inhabitants a variety of agricultural products such as milk, vegetables as well as meat. The Campus is on a 4,350 ha farm of which 1000 ha serves as a game park.

References

Omusati Region
1973 establishments in South West Africa
Educational institutions established in 1973
Agricultural education
University of Namibia